Inner City Records was a jazz record company and label founded by Irv Kratka in 1976 in New York City.

The company was a division of Music Minus One and also owned the label Classic Jazz. It started with reissues, then moved on to new recordings covering various types of jazz. Other non-jazz labels it released under the Inner City Records umbrella included Aural Explorer and City Sounds.

Inner City Records released over 60 albums between 1976 and 1980 and was voted the 1979 Record Label of the Year in the International Jazz Critics Poll.

Many Inner City albums were also issued on the Japanese East Wind Records, including Sam Morrison's Dune, The Three (Joe Sample, Ray Brown, Shelly Manne), and albums from Japanese musicians Sadao Watanabe and Terumasa Hino. Additional international labels licensed for release in the US include SteepleChase Records, Black & Blue, Vogue, and Enja. A three volume series of Django Reinhardt recordings licensed from Pathe Marconi included "Quintet of the Hot Club of France," which was nominated for a Grammy for Best Historical Recording.

Original Inner City Records productions included releases by Eddie Jefferson, Jeff Lorber, Dan Siegel, Listen featuring Mel Martin, Dry Jack, Sun Ra, Michel Urbaniak, Urzula Dudziak, and Susannah McCorkle.

Roster

Archie Shepp
Dry Jack*
Nat Adderley
Toshiko Akiyoshi
Art Ensemble of Chicago
Chet Baker
Gato Barbieri
Louie Bellson
Paul Bley
Anthony Braxton
Clifford Brown
David Friedman
David Friesen	
Dexter Gordon
Eddie Jefferson
Jeff Lorber
Cecil McBee
Susannah McCorkle
Cam Newton
New York Jazz Quartet
Django Reinhardt
Jerry Rusch
Dan Siegel
Memphis Slim
Roosevelt Sykes
Lew Tabackin
Lennie Tristano
Young Ed

References

Jazz record labels
American hip hop record labels